The 1974 All-Ireland Senior Hurling Championship Final was the 87th All-Ireland Final and the culmination of the 1974 All-Ireland Senior Hurling Championship, an inter-county hurling tournament for the top teams in Ireland. The match was held at Croke Park, Dublin, on 1 September 1974, between Kilkenny and Limerick. The Munster champions lost to their Leinster opponents on a score line of 3-19 to 1-13.

Match details

All-Ireland Senior Hurling Championship Final
All-Ireland Senior Hurling Championship Final, 1974
All-Ireland Senior Hurling Championship Final
All-Ireland Senior Hurling Championship Finals
Kilkenny GAA matches
Limerick GAA matches